Thomas Andrews (1873–1912) was the shipbuilder of the RMS Titanic.

Thomas, Tom or Tommy Andrews may also refer to:

Politics
Thomas Andrews (MP for Dover) (born before 1540), English politician
Tom Andrews (Australian politician) (1900–1974), Australian politician from Victoria
Thomas Andrews (American politician) (born 1953), American politician from Maine; non-profit executive; and United Nations Special Rapporteur on the Myanmar human rights situation 
T. Coleman Andrews (1899–1983), accountant and independent candidate for President of the United States
W. Thomas Andrews (1941–2009), Pennsylvania politician

Sports
Tommy Andrews (cricketer) (1890–1970), Australian cricketer
Tom Andrews (sprinter) (born 1954), American track and field athlete
Tom Andrews (American football) (born 1962), American NFL football player
Tom Andrews (cricketer) (born 1994), Australian cricketer

Other
Thomas Andrewes (died 1659), English financier who supported the parliament cause during the English Civil War
Thomas Andrews (metallurgist) (1811–1871), British metallurgist of international renown
Thomas Andrews (scientist) (1813–1885), Irish chemist and physicist
Thomas Andrews (ironmaster) (1847–1907), English ironmaker and Fellow of the Royal Society
Tom Andrews (poet) (1961–2001), American poet and critic
Thomas G. Andrews (historian), American historian
Thomas G. Andrews (judge) (1892–1942), American attorney and justice of the Oklahoma Supreme Court

See also
Andrews (surname)
Thomas Andrew (disambiguation)